The Valley City Times-Record is a daily (Monday to Friday) newspaper printed in Valley City, North Dakota and published by Horizon Publications.  The newspaper had its beginnings as the Valley City Weekly Times. The Times-Record is the official newspaper of Barnes County, North Dakota and has a modest circulation in southeast North Dakota. Ellie Boese is the editor and Bill Parson is the publisher.

References

External links

Newspapers published in North Dakota
Barnes County, North Dakota